The 2023 Fanatec GT2 European Series is the third season of the GT2 European Series. The season will begin on 21 April at Autodromo Nazionale Monza in Monza and will end on 7 October at Circuit Paul Ricard in Le Castellet.

Calendar 
For 2023 the opening round of the season was moved back to Monza, after having been to Imola for the 2022 season. The series will also be heading to Dijon and Portimão for the first time, while not returning to Spa or Misano.

Series News 

 This season sees the introduction of the Iron Cup, awarded to the top Pro-Am or Am entry of drivers with a combined age of over 100 years.
 The minimum driver age requirement got removed, allowing for drivers younger than 40 years to compete.

Entry List

Race results 
Bold indicates overall winner

References

External links 

 

GT2 European Series
GT2 European Series